This is a list of sexually active popes, Catholic priests who were not celibate before they became pope, and popes who were legally married. Some candidates were sexually active before their election as pope, and others were accused of being sexually active during their papacies. A number of them had offspring. The Second Lateran Council (1139) made the promise to remain celibate a prerequisite to ordination, abolishing the married priesthood in the Latin Church. Sexual relationships were generally undertaken therefore outside the bond of matrimony and each sexual act thus committed is considered a mortal sin by the Catholic Church.

There are various classifications for those who were sexually active during their lives. Periods in parentheses refer to the years of their papacies.

Background 

For many years of the Church's history, celibacy was considered optional. Based on the customs of the times, it is assumed by many that most of the Twelve Apostles, were married and had families. The New Testament (Mark 1:29–31; Matthew 8:14–15; Luke 4:38–39; 1 Timothy 3:2, 12; Titus 1:6) depicts at least Peter as being married, and bishops, priests and deacons of the Early Church were often married as well. In epigraphy, the testimony of the Church Fathers, synodal legislation, papal decretals and other sources in the following centuries, a married clergy, in greater or lesser numbers, was a feature of the life of the Church. Celibacy was not required for those ordained and was a discipline accepted in the early Church, particularly by those in the monastic life.

Although various local Church councils had demanded celibacy of the clergy in a particular area, at the Second Lateran Council (1139), the whole of the Latin Church of the Catholic Church decided to accept men for ordination only after they had taken a promise of celibacy. This applies to the leadership of the Church.

Popes who were legally married

Fathered illegitimate children before holy orders

Known to or suspected of having fathered illegitimate children after receiving holy orders

Relationships with women

Popes alleged to be sexually active during pontificate

Relationships with women

Relationships with men

Relationships with women and men

See also 
Pope Joan
Antipope John XXIII and Antipope Felix V
History of clerical celibacy in the Christian Church

Notes

References 

The Bad Popes, Chamberlin, E.R., Sutton History Classics, 1969 / Dorset; New Ed edition 2003.
The Pope Encyclopedia: An A to Z of the Holy See, Matthew Bunson, Crown Trade Paperbacks, New York, 1995.
The Papacy, Bernhard Schimmelpfennig, Columbia University Press, New York, 1984.
Lives of the Popes, Richard P. McBrien, Harper Collins, San Francisco, 1997.
Papal Genealogy, George L. Williams, McFarland& Co., Jefferson, North Carolina, 1998.
Sex Lives of the Popes, Nigel Cawthorne, Prion, London, 1996.
Popes and Anti-Popes, John Wilcock, Xlibris Corporation, 2005.
La véritable histoire des papes, Jean Mathieu-Rosay, Grancher, Paris, 1991

 
Sexually active popes
 
 
Popes, sexually active
Popes
Sexually active popes